Botswana made its Paralympic Games début at the 2004 Summer Paralympics in Athens, sending a single representative (Tshotlego Morama) to compete in athletics. Morama entered only the women's 400m T46 sprint, and won gold, setting a world record time of 55.99. No further athletes from Botswana have competed at the Summer Games, and Botswana has never taken part in the Winter Paralympics - leaving the country with a 100% gold medal success rate so far.

After her gold medal in Athens, Morama was due to represent Botswana again at the 2008 Summer Paralympics in Beijing, in the hopes of defending her title. She would have been the country's only representative. However, she withdrew prior to the Games due to injury and, shortly before the Games began, it was announced the country's (unspecified) other athletes, who might have replaced her, had been "rejected by organisers because they do not meet the qualifying criteria", namely having participated in international events.

For the 2012 Summer Paralympics in London, the country selected a single athlete, visually impaired runner Tshotlego Golden, who would take part in the men's 200m sprint (T13). Again, however, Botswana was forced to withdraw at the last moment, mere hours before the opening ceremony. This time the country's withdrawal was due to the Botswana National Olympic Committee cancelling its financial support, citing "financial irregularities" in the national Paralympics body.

Medal tables

Medals by Summer Games

Full results for Botswana at the Paralympics

See also
 Botswana at the Olympics

References